Albert Sévigny,  (December 31, 1881 – May 14, 1961) was a Canadian politician.

Life and career
Sévigny was born in Tingwick, Quebec. He opened a law practice in Quebec City in 1905. Two years later, he was a candidate for the Quebec Conservative Party in a provincial by-election, but was defeated. He was elected to the House of Commons of Canada in the 1911 federal election. His election was facilitated by an informal alliance between the Conservatives and the Nationalists led by Henri Bourassa because of Sevigny's sympathy with Bourassa's views.

In Parliament, Sevigny became a supporter of Canadian participation in World War I despite the strong opposition of most Quebecers, and became a staunch Conservative. He was appointed Deputy Speaker in 1915, and in 1916, he became Speaker of the House of Commons of Canada.

Prime Minister Robert Borden was facing an increasing divisive crisis over conscription with the country divided between English Canadians who supported the measure and French-Canadians who fervently opposed it. In early 1917, Borden asked Sevigny to leave the Speaker's chair and join the Cabinet to help the government persuade Quebecers of the government's case.

Sévigny was appointed Minister of Inland Revenue, and was required by the laws of the time to resign his seat and run in a by-election. He was re-elected by a margin of only 257 votes.

In June, Borden introduced conscription and, of the French Canadian Members of Parliament, only three voted for the conscription bill, including Sévigny.

Borden formed a Union government with dissident Liberals and called a general election in 1917 on the conscription issue. The country divided largely along linguistic lines: the Conservative candidates were wiped out in Quebec in a rout that cost Sévigny his seat. Borden's coalition dominated the election in English Canada, however, and he was returned with a strong majority.

In 1921, the Conservative government appointed Sévigny to the Quebec Superior Court on which he served for 39 years, becoming Associate Chief Justice in 1933 and Chief Justice in 1942.

In 1950, Sévigny presided over the murder trial of Albert Guay, who was responsible for the bombing of Canadian Pacific Air Lines Flight 108.

References

External links
 
 

1881 births
1961 deaths
Lawyers in Quebec
Judges in Quebec
Conservative Party of Canada (1867–1942) MPs
Members of the King's Privy Council for Canada
Speakers of the House of Commons of Canada